Lawrence McCully Judd (March 20, 1887 – October 4, 1968) was a politician of the Territory of Hawaii, serving as the territorial governor. Judd is most well-known for his role in the Massie Affair, in which he commuted the sentence of three people convicted of manslaughter in the killing of Josef Kahahawai.

Life
Judd was born March 20, 1887, in Honolulu, Hawaii, the grandson of Gerrit P. Judd, who was an early American Missionary, a cabinet minister to King Kamehameha III, and co-founder of Punahou School.
His father was Judge Albert Francis Judd (1838–1900) and mother was Agnes Hall Boyd (1844–1934). He was the last of nine children. He was married March 6, 1909, at Richmond Hill, New York, to Florence Bell Hackett (1885–1974) and had five children: Helen Florence (1909-?), Agnes Elizabeth (1912-?), Sophie Janet (1913–?), Lawrence McCully Jr. (1917–?) and Emilie Bell (1920–?).
Judd married his second wife, Eva Marie Lillibridge (1913–2002) in 1938.

Judd attended the Punahou School, The Hotchkiss School, and the University of Pennsylvania, where he was a member of its fraternity chapter of Phi Kappa Psi.

Career
Judd made several fact-finding tours during his tenure in the Hawaii Territorial Senate 1920–1927.

Governor of HawaiI
Herbert Hoover appointed Judd to succeed Wallace Rider Farrington as Governor of Hawaii Territory from 1929 to 1934. As territorial governor, he overhauled the system of governance in the colony. A source of controversy during his tenure, Judd commuted the sentence of Grace Hubbard Fortescue, socialite and niece of Alexander Graham Bell, convicted in the territorial courts of manslaughter in the death of a local man, Joseph Kahahawai. Hiring defense lawyer Clarence Darrow, Fortescue's case was known as the Massie Affair, a focus of nationwide newspaper coverage.  Massie's sentence of ten years in prison was whittled down to one hour in the governor's chambers at Iolani Palace. The affair was the subject of a 2005 episode of the PBS series The American Experience, which included archival footage of Judd.

Resident superintendent
Judd became Kalaupapa's resident superintendent in 1947.

Judd's service running Kalaupapa was a subject in the 2003 historical novel and national bestseller called Moloka'i by Alan Brennert as well as the historical account, The Colony: The Harrowing True Story of the Exiles of Molokai by John Tayman.

Samoa and retirement
On 4 March 1953, President Dwight D. Eisenhower appointed Judd Governor of American Samoa on a temporary basis. He served only five months.

Judd died on October 4, 1968, in Honolulu and was interred in the city's Oahu Cemetery in Nuuanu Valley.

References

External links

 Descendants of Thomas Hastings website

1887 births
1968 deaths
Members of the Hawaii Territorial Legislature
Governors of American Samoa
Governors of the Territory of Hawaii
Punahou School alumni
Hotchkiss School alumni
University of Pennsylvania alumni
Hawaii Republicans
American Samoa Republicans
20th-century American politicians
Burials at Oahu Cemetery
Judd family